The 2021 PDC Nordic & Baltic ProTour consisted of 5 darts tournaments on the 2021 PDC Pro Tour.

Prize money
The prize money for the Nordic & Baltic ProTour events saw each having a prize fund of €5,000.

This is how the prize money is divided:

Results

Nordic & Baltic ProTour 1
ProTour 1 was contested on Thursday 19 August 2021 at Bullseye Darts in Reykjavík, Iceland. The winner was Daniel Larsson.

Nordic & Baltic ProTour 2
ProTour 2 was contested on Friday 20 August 2021 at Bullseye Darts in Reykjavík, Iceland. The winner was Madars Razma.

Nordic & Baltic ProTour 3
ProTour 3 was contested on Friday 20 August 2021 at Bullseye Darts in Reykjavík, Iceland. The winner was Andreas Toft Jorgensen.

Nordic & Baltic ProTour 4
ProTour 4 was contested on Saturday 21 August 2021 at Bullseye Darts in Reykjavík, Iceland. The winner was Marko Kantele.

Nordic & Baltic ProTour 5
ProTour 5 was contested on Saturday 21 August 2021 at Bullseye Darts in Reykjavík, Iceland. The winner was Madars Razma.

References

2021 in darts
2021 PDC Pro Tour